Leopold Kessler may refer to:

Leopold Kessler (Zionist) (1864-1944)
Leopold Kessler (artist)